The 12369 / 12370 Kumbha Express is a Superfast Express express train belonging to Indian Railways – Eastern Railway zone that runs between  and  in India.

It operates as train number 12369 from Howrah Junction to Dehradun and as train number 12370 in the reverse direction, serving the states of West Bengal, Jharkhand, Bihar, Uttar Pradesh & Uttarakhand.

Coaches

The 12369/12370 Kumbha Express presently has 1 AC 2 tier, 1 AC 3 tier, 8 Sleeper class, 2 Unreserved/General & 2 SLR (Seating cum Luggage Rake) coaches.

Additionally, it also has a pantry car.

As is customary with most train services in India, coach composition may be amended at the discretion of Indian Railways depending on demand.

Service

The 12369 Kumbha Express covers the distance of 1587 kilometres in 29 hours 5 mins (55 km/hr) & in 29 hours 5 mins as 12370 Kumbha Express (55 km/hr).

As the average speed of the train is above , as per Indian Railways rules, its fare includes a Superfast surcharge.

Routeing

 to
Dehradun

Traction

As the route is fully electrified, it is hauled by a Howrah-based WAP-4 / WAP-7 locomotive from Howrah until Dehradun and vice versa.

Timings

 12369 Kumbha Express leaves Howrah Junction every day except Tuesday & Friday at 13:00 hrs IST and reaches Dehradun at 18:05 hrs IST the next day.
 12370 Kumbha Express leaves Dehradun every day except Wednesday & Saturday at 22:10 hrs IST and reaches Howrah Junction at 03:15 hrs IST the next day.

Rake sharing
The train shares its rake with 12327/12328 Upasana Express.

References 

http://www.er.indianrailways.gov.in/er/notice/1382605760900_Tender%20Notice.pdf

External links

Rail transport in Howrah
Trains from Haridwar
Express trains in India
Rail transport in West Bengal
Rail transport in Jharkhand
Rail transport in Bihar
Rail transport in Uttar Pradesh
Railway services introduced in 2009
Named passenger trains of India